is an ice hockey video game released by Sega in 1986 for the Master System. The game requires the Sega Sports Pad. It is a part of the Great line of sports games released by Sega for the Master System in 1986 in North America, and in 1987 in Japan (though only as a competition prize in the Beep! magazine).

Gameplay
The game plays as a regular hockey match. Two difficulty settings (junior and senior) are options for amateur or more skilled players. The player is assigned the US hockey team and then choose from a number of opponents from seven other countries: Poland, West Germany, Czechoslovakia, Finland, Canada, Sweden and USSR.

See also
Ice Hockey (1988 video game)

Notes

References

External links

1986 video games
Ice hockey video games
Sega video games
Master System games
Master System-only games
Video games developed in Japan